Beautiful Scars may refer to:

 Beautiful Scars, a 2007 album by Kip Hanrahan,
 Beautiful Scars, a 2017 memoir by Tom Wilson,
 Beautiful Scars (film), a 2022 documentary film by Shane Belcourt, about Wilson and based in part on the book.